Peter Mollez (born 23 September 1983 in Poperinge) is a Belgian football goalkeeper.

Career
Mollez was a promising youngster. He was even offered a test period at Arsenal, but Club Brugge refused that. However, Mollez never achieved his break-through at Club, and he was eventually loaned to Cercle Brugge. Quite ironically, Mollez made his début at the highest level of Belgian football with Cercle Brugge in a match against Club Brugge. Mollez had to replace the red carded Ricky Begeyn. Cercle lost the match 5–0.

Mollez finally became a first team regular with KV Kortrijk in second division as KV Kortrijk became Second Division champions.

References

1983 births
Living people
Association football goalkeepers
Belgian footballers
K.V. Kortrijk players
Club Brugge KV players
Cercle Brugge K.S.V. players
K.A.A. Gent players
Belgian Pro League players
F.C.V. Dender E.H. players
People from Poperinge
Footballers from West Flanders